David Coughlan is a current Gaelic Football and Hurler with Kinsale GAA. Born on 26 May 1988 he has played for Kinsale GAA at various under age levels winning an under 12 B county football championship which kick started his career. He progressed to captain minor teams in 2005 which won the South East B hurling and football double.

Hurling
David started his Junior hurling career at the age of 16 lining out wing back in a championship loss to Shamrocks. Kinsale progressed through the back door that year to reach the final only to lose to Shamrocks once again in an unlucky season in which Coughlan starred.

David won his first Carrigdhoun Junior Hurling Championship in 2007 where he played wing back on a team which defeated Ballymartle in the final in Carrigaline in which Cian Quigley also had a storming game.

Football
David began his adult football career with Kinsale in 2006 when they were promoted to the intermediate grade. David was carried at midfield by Richard O'Sullivan in the first game played at this level for the club against Cill Na Martra which Kinsale won. Coughlan was called up to the Cork minor panel on the back of his performance in that game and was listed on the panel which lost to Tipperary in the semi final played in the Gaelic grounds in Limerick.

He was a member of the Cork Institute of Technology 2009 Sigerson winning cup panel and also won a Fresher A all-Ireland hurling medal.

He played mid field for Kinsale in the 2011 Cork Intermediate Football Championship winning team which defeated Castletownbere in the final. David played alongside his two more accomplished brothers Mark "Sparky" and Brian "Hollywood" Coughlan.

Honours Won
 Cork Intermediate Football Championship 2011
 Carrigdhoun Junior Hurling Championship 2007
 Sigerson Cup 2009
 All-Ireland Fresher A Hurling 2008
 Carrigdhoun Minor Hurling Championship 2005
 Carrigdhoun Minor Football Championship 2005

References

1988 births
Living people
Kinsale hurlers
Kinsale Gaelic footballers